Kim Dong-jin (born 28 December 1992) is a South Korean footballer who plays as defender for FC Anyang in K League 2.

Career
He was selected by Daegu FC in the 2014 K League draft.

References

External links 

1992 births
Living people
Association football defenders
South Korean footballers
Daegu FC players
Asan Mugunghwa FC players
Gyeongnam FC players
FC Anyang players
K League 2 players
K League 1 players
Ajou University alumni